John Rugge was an English Anglican priest in the 16th century.

He was the son of Robert Rugge (by 1503 – 18 February 1558/9), Mayor of Norwich and Elizabeth, daughter of Robert Wood of Norwich, the nephew of William Rugge, Bishop of Norwich and the brother of Francis Rugge (1535–1607), Mayor of Norwich, and a relation of Thomas Rugge, the diarist.

John Rugge was created Archdeacon of Wells in place of John Cotterell in 1572. He was noted for his knowledge of civil law, which he studied in Germany. He became vicar of Wynford in 1573, a Canon of Westminster in 1576, and died in 1581. He held both positions until his death in 1581.

Langworth was  educated at the University of Oxford. He held livings at Winsford and Chedzoy.

Notes

1581 deaths
16th-century English Anglican priests
Archdeacons of Wells
Alumni of the University of Oxford